Privileges and Immunities may refer:

in international law, to privileges and immunities afforded by international treaties:
 Diplomatic immunity
 Consular immunity
 more specifically to specific international organizations and (partially) their staff, see in general Privileges and immunities or international organizations, and for particular organizations for example:
 Convention on the Privileges and Immunities of the United Nations
 Agreement on the Privileges and Immunities of the International Criminal Court
 Privileges and immunities of the European Communities
 Privileges and immunities of the Council of Europe

in national law, to privileges and immunities provided for in respective national laws:
 Sovereign immunity
 others, see Immunity#Law
 in U.S. law, see for example:
 in the U.S. constitution, the Privileges and Immunities Clause (to be distinguished from the Privileges or Immunities Clause of the Fourteenth Amendment)
 Sovereign immunity in the United States
 privileges and immunities granted by the Foreign Sovereign Immunities Act
 privileges and immunities granted by the International Organizations Immunities Act

See also 
 Immunity  (disambiguation)
 Privilege (disambiguation)